A genre of the troubadours, the  or  ("lament") is a funeral lament for "a great personage, a protector, a friend or relative, or a lady." Its main elements are expression of grief, praise of the deceased (eulogy) and prayer for his or her soul. It is descended from the medieval Latin .

They made use of existing melodies, often imitating the original song even down to the rhymes. The most famous  of all, however, Gaucelm Faidit's lament on the death of King Richard the Lionheart in 1199, was set to original music.

Elisabeth Schulze-Busacker identifies three types of : "the moralizing ", in which the expression of grief is a point of departure for social criticism; "the true lament", in which personal grief is central; and "the courtly ", in which the impact of the death on the court is emphasised. In the conventions of the genre, the subject's death is announced by the simple words  ("is dead"). By the 13th century, the placement of these words within the poem was fixed: it occurred in the seventh or eighth line of the first stanza.

There are forty-four surviving . The earliest  is that by Cercamon on the death of Duke William X of Aquitaine in 1137. The latest is an anonymous lament on the death of King Robert of Naples in 1343.

Chronological table of 
The following table lists 42 .

References

Further reading
Jeanroy, Alfred. . Toulouse: Privat, 1934. 

Western medieval lyric forms
Occitan literary genres